Dorvin House, near Hahnville, Louisiana, was built around 1840 to 1850.  It was listed on the National Register of Historic Places in 1990.  It has also been known as Mollere House and as Rosedon.

It is a one-and-a-half-story house built of cypress and briquette entre poteaux (brick between posts) construction.  The house is of Creole style, with Creole features including:
its steeply pitched hipped roof
the briquette entre poteaux wall construction, 
its "three sets of French doors (six lites per leaf) on the facade and one set at the rear of the original structure",
its usage of beaded beam ceilings in the gallery and inside, and
four fireplace mantels "which wrap around the chimney flues in the French manner."

Including from renovations, it also includes elements of Greek Revival and Federal style.

It is located on Louisiana Highway 18 northwest of Hahnville.

References

National Register of Historic Places in St. Charles Parish, Louisiana
Creole architecture in Louisiana
Federal architecture in Louisiana
Greek Revival architecture in Louisiana
Houses completed in 1840